Rupert Wilson Wigmore,  (October 5, 1873 – April 3, 1939) was a Canadian politician.

Born in Saint John, New Brunswick, he was a civil engineer before being elected to the House of Commons of Canada representing St. John--Albert in the 1917 federal election. A Unionist and later Conservative, he was Minister of Customs and Inland Revenue and Minister of Customs and Excise.

References

1873 births
1939 deaths
Members of the House of Commons of Canada from New Brunswick
Members of the King's Privy Council for Canada
Unionist Party (Canada) MPs